"Oklahoma" is the title song from the 1943 Broadway musical Oklahoma!, named for the setting of the musical play. The music and lyrics were written by Richard Rodgers and Oscar Hammerstein II.  The melody is reprised in the main title of the 1955 film version and in the overtures of both film and musical productions.

In 1953, the Oklahoma legislature chose it as the state song of Oklahoma, replacing a less well-known song, "Oklahoma -  A Toast", that had been adopted in 1935.

Rodgers and Hammerstein song
Midway through the second act of the play, after the principals Curly and Laurey are married, Curly begins to sing the song and is soon joined by the entire cast as a chorus. The lyric, which briefly depicts the Midwestern twang phonetically, describes the landscape and prairie weather in positive language. It further emphasizes the wholesome aspects of rural life, and the steadfast dedication of the region's inhabitants, against the overtly stated formal backdrop of the territory's impending admission to the Union in 1907.

Hammerstein's lyric is also notable and memorable for its trochaic re-iteration of its title as a chant, and the final iambic eight-letter spelling of the title as a play on the colloquial English word "Okay". Orchestrator Robert Russell Bennett's massive 8-part chorale near the end of the song extends it to include a spelling of the name, ending with an epic ritardando leading into one last iteration of "Oklahoma."

The state of Oklahoma officially adopted the song as its state song in 1953.  It is the only official state song from a Broadway musical.  State Representative George Nigh, who later served as the state's Governor, was the principal author of the legislation designating the state song.

The song also serves as one of the key songs of the University of Oklahoma.  The song plays as one of the hourly tunes from the bell tower on campus.  The song is also played by the Pride of Oklahoma at various Oklahoma Sooners athletic events and other campus events.

Previous state song
According to the Oklahoma Historical Society, the first state song was "Oklahoma -  A Toast". It was written in 1905 by Mrs. Harriett Parker Camden, a resident of Kingfisher, Oklahoma. It became a hit within the state, and was adopted as the state song by the legislature on March 26, 1935.  The lyrics of the refrain are:
"I give you a land of sun and flowers, and summer a whole year long, I give you a land where the golden hours roll by to the mockingbird's song, Where the cotton blooms 'neath the southern sun, where the vintage hangs thick on the vine. A land whose story has just begun. This wonderful land of mine."

Award
Members of the Western Writers of America chose "Oklahoma" as one of the Top 100 Western songs of all time.

References

External links
  Title 25 Oklahoma Statutes - Chapter 3: §. 94.3 Words of State Song (which comprise a portion of actual Oklahoma state legislation)
Voices of Oklahoma interview with George Nigh, Chapter 6 of his interview. First person interview conducted on May 1, 2009 with George Nigh, principal author of the bill designating "Oklahoma" the state song of Oklahoma.
Lyrics of "Oklahoma - A Toast"

Shirley Jones songs
Songs from Oklahoma!
United States state songs
Music of Oklahoma
Songs with music by Richard Rodgers
Songs with lyrics by Oscar Hammerstein II
1943 songs
Symbols of Oklahoma
Songs about Oklahoma